Jean Marc Calvet (born March 23, 1965) is a French artist living in Granada, Nicaragua. Calvet was one of six winners of the VII Biennale of Nicaraguan Arts in 2009 selected to represent Nicaragua at the Biennale of Central America in Panama in 2010.

Calvet was born in Nice, France. With no prior art experience, Calvet said he began painting at the age of 38 following a drug-induced rage while living in Costa Rica.

Calvet is the subject of a 2010 documentary by British filmmaker Dominic Allan.

Recognition
Jury Prize, VII Biennale of Nicaraguan Arts (Bienal de Artes Visuales Nicaragüense), Managua, Nicaragua
Jury Prize (Prix du Jury), Exposition Internationale d'Arts Plastiques, Paris

References

Further reading
Calvet's catharsis: how painting saved this colourful artist's life The guardian (December 6, 2011)
Alone: Jean Marc Calvet Penelope Przekop (March 1, 2010)
El niño interior: Jean Marc Calvet at TEDx Managua TEDx Video (Jan 17, 2013)
Tormented artist paints his way back to life The Nicaragua Dispatch (Aug 12, 2012)
The art of Jean Marc Calvet Ibiza Voice (Jan 26, 2015)
Jean Marc Calvet, l' enfant de la rue devenu peintre IJSBERG Magazine (Feb 13, 2015)

External links
personal website 
Interview with film director Dominic Allan about his documentary film on Jean Marc Calvet at subtitledonline.com

1965 births
Living people
French artists